Mohammad Sami (born 12 December 1984) is a Pakistani first-class cricketer who played for Faisalabad cricket team.

References

External links
 

1984 births
Living people
Pakistani cricketers
Faisalabad cricketers
Cricketers from Faisalabad